Operation Berlin (25–26 September 1944) was a night-time evacuation of the remnants of the beleaguered British 1st Airborne Division, trapped in German-occupied territory north of the Lower Rhine in the Netherlands during Operation Market Garden in the Second World War. The aim of the operation was to withdraw safely the remnants of the division while covered by the 1st Polish Parachute Brigade and surrounded on three sides by superior German forces and in danger of being encircled and destroyed.

The operation evacuated approximately 2,400 men of the British 1st Airborne Division, ending Market Garden, the Allied plan to cross the Rhine and end the war in Europe by the end of 1944. The surviving glider pilots laid white tape through the woods, leading from the Perimeter, the grounds of the Hartenstein Hotel, to the north bank of the Neder-Rijn (Lower Rhine) where the Royal Canadian Engineers and British Royal Engineers were waiting with small boats to ferry them across the Rhine to a landing point north of Driel.

Background

Operation Market Garden

In September 1944 the Allies launched Operation Market Garden, an attempt to advance into the Ruhr, Germany's industrial heartland, by bypassing the northern end of the Siegfried Line. The goal of Market Garden was to end the war around Christmas 1944 by capturing the Ruhr industry, thus crippling Germany's capacity to produce military materiel to sustain its firepower. The British 1st Airborne Division and the American 82nd and 101st Airborne Divisions were to seize and hold several strategic bridges in the Netherlands through which General Brian Horrocks' XXX Corps could strike into Germany.

At the end of this  'airborne corridor' was Arnhem on the lower Rhine. By holding this bridge, the Allied forces could turn south and push into the Ruhr valley. Of the troops dropped into Arnhem, approximately 40% were members of the Parachute Regiment, later supported by members of the Polish 1st Independent Parachute Brigade. The remainder of the division comprised regiments flown in by the Glider Pilot Regiment. They expected to be relieved by XXX Corps within two days.

The landings and parachute drops began on 17 September 1944 and lasted three days. However, resistance was much higher than anticipated. The II SS Panzer Corps had been sent to this part of the Netherlands to refit after Normandy. As a result, only a small force led by Major John Frost were able to reach Arnhem bridge. The British paratroopers managed to take one end but were heavily outnumbered and outgunned. They were defeated after four days of intense fighting. The rest of the 1st Airborne division established a defensive perimeter around the Hartenstein Hotel in Oosterbeek (a suburb west of Arnhem), known as the Oosterbeek Perimeter.

The British forces' hope was that when XXX Corps did arrive, they would be able to cross the river and establish a bridgehead. Four days after the start of the operation, the 1st Polish Parachute Brigade landed at Driel south of the Rhine on 21 September. Without equipment to cross the river, they were unable to assist the besieged British troops. Although the Allies managed to win the Battle of Nijmegen (17–21 September) and move XXX Corps across the river Waal that day, the troops were exhausted after five days of fighting and did not advance further until the next day. Lead elements of the severely delayed XXX Corps reached the Poles on 22 September.

Efforts to relieve the 1st Airborne Division
Major General Roy Urquhart, commander of the 1st Airborne Division, originally requested the 1st Polish Brigade to cross the river and take up their positions on the night of 21 September.  However neither unit had any boats and so the Poles withdrew into Driel for the night, setting up a hedgehog defence.  Lead elements of XXX Corps reached Driel the following day, but at the same time the Germans formed a blocking line to the west to prevent an Allied advance on the road bridge.

During the day the 1st Division sourced six rubber boats and again assisted the Polish attempt to cross.  That night (the 22nd) the plan was put into operation, but the tow rope designed to pull the boats across snapped, and the oars were too small to row against the river's strong current. 55 men crossed, but only 35 were able to reach the British positions.

On the 23rd the 43rd (Wessex) Division arrived at Driel in strength and offered assault boats for the Poles. Unfortunately, these arrived late and the Poles, unfamiliar with the craft, were able to put only 153 men across the river - less than a quarter of the hoped for reinforcement.

On the 24th, Horrocks himself visited the Polish positions to assess the situation.  That afternoon a conference was held at Valburg to discuss how best to relieve what was left of the 1st Airborne. Major General Ivor Thomas of the 43rd (Wessex) Division outlined a plan to put across a battalion of his division and one of the Polish battalions - to the fury of their commander Major General Stanisław Sosabowski. Despite this it seems that Horrocks realised the futility of the 1st Airborne's position and preliminary plans were drawn up for its withdrawal.

That night's attempt to cross the river was disastrous. Insufficient boats arrived for both battalions and so only the 4th Battalion The Dorsetshire Regiment made the attempt. Unfortunately, their crossing led into prepared German positions and of the 315 men who crossed before daylight, over 200 were captured. Two men who did reach the Airborne forces carried copies of the withdrawal plan for Urquhart's consideration.

These initial attempts met with only minimal success. The next step was to evacuate the remnants of the 1st Airborne using small boats across the Neder Rijn at night. Four sapper field companies were tasked for Operation Berlin: the Royal Engineer 260th and 553rd Field Companies and Royal Canadian Engineer 20th and 23rd Field Companies. The operation was to start at 22:00 on the 25th but the field companies had left many hours earlier and moved through German positions to the south bank of the Neder Rijn. In dismal weather and under constant German machine gun, mortar, and artillery fire, the boats shuttled back and forth across the wide swift river through the night. The evacuation went on until daylight came and the operation was forced to cease.

Outcome
Of the original 10,095 men landed by parachute and glider at Arnhem, 2,500 were fighting capable on the night of the 25th. Of these, 2,163 British, among them, 75 men of the 4th Dorsets, along with 160 Poles, made it across the Rhine and into the safety of Driel. Operation Berlin rescued some 2500 airborne troops with the 23rd Field Company recovering the majority of the besieged paratroopers in approximately 150 boatloads. 23rd Field Company lost seven killed and 14 wounded while five were decorated for their heroic actions.

Monument

On the south bank of the Rhine there is a monument commemorating the role of the Canadian and British engineers who participated in Operation Berlin.  The text on the monument is: It is 25th September 1944: The battle of Arnhem is still raging, but the position of the surrounded British and Polish troops on the northern Rhine bank has become untenable. Then the order for their evacuation across the river is given. In that rainy night hundreds of soldiers come in small parties to the river forelands, between the farmhouse and the Old Church - both clearly visible from here - and wait to be rescued. Under heavy German fire from the Westerbouwing, British (260 and 553 Fd Coys) and Canadian (20 and 23 Fd Coys) Engineers make dozens of trips in their small boats from this bank. In one night, supported by other units, they manage to rescue 2,400 airborne troops. At the time the rescued had hardly seen their savers, so they have never been able to thank them. This monument has been erected to express their gratitude (15 September 1989).

References

Bibliography
 
 
 
 
 
 Kerry and McDill, The History of the Corps of Royal Canadian Engineers, Vol II 1936 - 1946

Berlin
Operation Market Garden
Berlin
September 1944 events
Military withdrawals